A remote control is any device used to control a remote operation.

Remote control may also refer to:

Film, television and theatre 
 Remote Control (1930 film), a film starring William Haines
 Remote Control (1988 film), a film starring Kevin Dillon
 Remote Control (1992 film), an Icelandic movie
 Remote Control, a 1972 film from Hollis Frampton's Hapax Legomena cycle
 Remote Control (game show), a 1987–1990 American game show
 Remote Control, an Indian TV series featuring Mansi Parekh
 "Remote Control" (Flashpoint), a 2009 episode of Flashpoint
 "Remote Control" (The Zeta Project), an episode of The Zeta Project
 "Remote Control", an episode of LazyTown
 "Remote Control", an episode of Modern Marvels
 Remote Control, a musical by Robert Steadman

Literature 
 Remote Control (McNab novel), a 1997 novel by Andy McNab starting the Nick Stone Missions novel series
 Remote Control (Heath novel), 2007 by Jack Heath
 Remote Control (Isaka novel), 2011 by Kōtarō Isaka
 Remote Control (novella), a 2021 novella by Nnedi Okorafor

Music 
 Remote Control (The Tubes album), 1979
 Remote Control (TVT album), the 7th volume of the Television's Greatest Hits series of compilation albums by TVT Records
 "Remote Control" (Beastie Boys song)
 "Remote Control" (The Clash song), 1977
 "Remote Control" (The Reddings song), 1980
 "Remote Control", a song by Age of Electric
 "Remote Control", a song by Suzi Quatro from Main Attraction
 "Remote Control", a song by Kanye West from Donda
 "Remote Control (Me)", a song by Electric Six from Fire

Video games 
 Remote Control (video game), a game for the NES produced by Hi Tech Expressions

Companies 
 Remote Control Productions (American company), a film music company run by Hans Zimmer
 Remote Control Productions (German company), a video game studio
 Remote Control Records, an Australian record label

See also
 Remote control software or remote desktop software
 Remote control vehicle
 Remote keyless system
 Remotely Controlled, an album by Christian humorist Mark Lowry
 Universal remote
 Radio control
 Teleoperation, controlling something remotely.